Princess Philippine Charlotte of Prussia (13 March 1716, in Berlin – 17 February 1801, in Brunswick) was Duchess of Brunswick-Wolfenbüttel by marriage to Duke Charles I. Philippine Charlotte was a known intellectual in contemporary Germany. She is listed as a female composer as she is thought to have written marches and other music.

Life
Philippine Charlotte was the fourth child and third daughter of Frederick William I of Prussia and his wife Sophia Dorothea of Hanover (those who reached adulthood; she was otherwise seventh child and fourth daughter).

On 2 July 1733 in Berlin, Princess Philippine Charlotte married Duke Charles of Brunswick-Wolfenbüttel, eldest son of Ferdinand Albert II, Duke of Brunswick-Wolfenbüttel.  Charles inherited the dukedom on his father's death in 1735, making her Duchess consort.

The double marriage alliance between Prussia and Brunswick by her marriage to Charles I, and that of her brother Frederick to Charles' sister Elisabeth Christine, led to a permanent alliance of the most important North German Protestant houses Prussia and Brunswick.
The family ties of the two dynasties resulted the alliance of Brunswick and Prussia in the Seven Years' War, and the career of Philippines sons in the Prussian service.

Philippine Charlotte was described as subtle, highly educated and a child of the enlightenment. 
She worked independently of an extract of the philosophical writings of Christian von Wolff in French. The Duchess pursued, partly because of the influence of the ducal adviser Johann Friedrich Wilhelm Jerusalem, the German intellectual life very closely. She appreciated the poet Salomon Gessner and maintained a personal relationship Friedrich Gottlieb Klopstock. The dramatist Lessing were also among her circle.

As Duchess consort, Philippine Charlotte's court life focused on the circle of conversation she held before and after dinner in her state apartments in the Grauer Hof, to which she attracted scholars and men of letters with positions at court. The Brunswick court attended a few opera performances and public balls a year in accordance with court etiquette, but the large expenditure of her spouse soon made it necessary to have a more economic court life.

She raised her son Charles in reverence of her brother, Frederick of Prussia, gave him a humanist education with Abbé Jerusalem among his tutors, and sent him on a Grand Tour with the archaeologist Winckelmann as his companion.

In 1773, Charles I was obliged to make his son regent, and in 1780, he died, and was succeeded by her son.

The Swedish Princess Hedwig Elizabeth Charlotte described her, as well as her family, at the time of a visit in August, 1799: Our cousin, the Duke, arrived immediately the next morning. [...] After he left us, I visited the Dowager Duchess, the aunt of my consort. She is an agreeable, highly educated and well respected lady, but by now so old that she has almost lost her memory. 

Philippine Charlotte left to the Wolfenbüttel Library her own collection of 4,000 volumes.

Issue

Ancestry

References

External links

1716 births
1801 deaths
House of Hohenzollern
House of Brunswick-Bevern
Prussian princesses
People from Berlin
Duchesses of Brunswick-Lüneburg
Duchesses of Brunswick-Wolfenbüttel
Daughters of kings
Burials at Brunswick Cathedral